3450 or variant, may refer to:

In general
 A.D. 3450, a year in the 4th millennium CE
 3450 BC, a year in the 4th millennium BCE
 3450, a number in the 3000 (number) range

Other uses
 3450 Dommanget, an asteroid in the Asteroid Belt, the 3450th asteroid registered
 Santa Fe class 3450, a class of steam locomotive
 Texas Farm to Market Road 3450, a state highway

See also